Jarud Banner is a banner of eastern Inner Mongolia, People's Republic of China. It is under the administration of Tongliao City, and the China National Highway 304 passes through the area.

Climate
Jarud Banner has a monsoon-influenced, continental semi-arid climate (Köppen BSk), with very cold and dry winters, hot, somewhat humid summers, and strong winds, especially in spring. There are 2,883 hours of bright sunshine annually, with each of the winter months having over two-thirds of the possible total, and this percentage falling to 54 in July.

References

External links
www.xzqh.org 

Banners of Inner Mongolia
Tongliao